LAPACK ("Linear Algebra Package") is a standard software library for numerical linear algebra. It provides routines for solving systems of linear equations and linear least squares, eigenvalue problems, and singular value decomposition. It also includes routines to implement the associated matrix factorizations such as LU, QR, Cholesky and Schur decomposition. LAPACK was originally written in FORTRAN 77, but moved to Fortran 90 in version 3.2 (2008). The routines handle both real and complex matrices in both single and double precision. LAPACK relies on an underlying BLAS implementation to provide efficient and portable computational building blocks for its routines.

LAPACK was designed as the successor to the linear equations and linear least-squares routines of LINPACK and the eigenvalue routines of EISPACK. LINPACK, written in the 1970s and 1980s, was designed to run on the then-modern vector computers with shared memory.  LAPACK, in contrast, was designed to effectively exploit the caches on modern cache-based architectures and the instruction-level parallelism of modern superscalar processors, and thus can run orders of magnitude faster than LINPACK on such machines, given a well-tuned BLAS implementation. LAPACK has also been extended to run on distributed memory systems in later packages such as ScaLAPACK and PLAPACK.

Netlib LAPACK is licensed under a three-clause BSD style license, a permissive free software license with few restrictions.

Naming scheme
Subroutines in LAPACK have a naming convention which makes the identifiers very compact. This was necessary as the first Fortran standards only supported identifiers up to six characters long, so the names had to be shortened to fit into this limit.

A LAPACK subroutine name is in the form pmmaaa, where:

 p is a one-letter code denoting the type of numerical constants used. S, D stand for real floating-point arithmetic respectively in single and double precision, while C and Z stand for complex arithmetic with respectively single and double precision. The newer version, LAPACK95, uses generic subroutines in order to overcome the need to explicitly specify the data type.
 mm is a two-letter code denoting the kind of matrix expected by the algorithm. The codes for the different kind of matrices are reported below; the actual data are stored in a different format depending on the specific kind; e.g., when the code DI is given, the subroutine expects a vector of length n containing the elements on the diagonal, while when the code GE is given, the subroutine expects an  array containing the entries of the matrix.
 aaa is a one- to three-letter code describing the actual algorithm implemented in the subroutine, e.g. SV denotes a subroutine to solve linear system, while R denotes a rank-1 update.

For example, the subroutine to solve a linear system with a general (non-structured) matrix using real double-precision arithmetic is called DGESV.

Use with other programming languages and libraries
Many programming environments today support the use of libraries with C binding, allowing LAPACK routines to be used directly so long as a few restrictions are observed. Additionally, many other software libraries and tools for scientific and numerical computing are built on top of LAPACK, such as R, MATLAB, and SciPy.

Several alternative language bindings are also available:

 Armadillo for C++
 IT++ for C++
 LAPACK++ for C++
 Lacaml for OCaml
 CLapack for C
 SciPy for Python
 Gonum for Go
 NLapack for .NET

Implementations 
As with BLAS, LAPACK is sometimes forked or rewritten to provide better performance on specific systems.  Some of the implementations are:

 Accelerate Apple's framework for macOS and iOS, which includes tuned versions of BLAS and LAPACK.
 Netlib LAPACK The official LAPACK.
 Netlib ScaLAPACK Scalable (multicore) LAPACK, built on top of PBLAS.
 Intel MKL Intel's Math routines for their x86 CPUs.
 OpenBLAS Open-source reimplementation of BLAS and LAPACK.
 Gonum LAPACK A partial native Go implementation.

Since LAPACK typically calls underlying BLAS routines to perform the bulk of its computations, simply linking to a better-tuned BLAS implementation can be enough to significantly improve performance. As a result, LAPACK is not reimplemented as often as BLAS is.

Similar projects 

These projects provide a similar functionality to LAPACK, but with a main interface differing from that of LAPACK: 

 Libflame A dense linear algebra library. Has a LAPACK-compatible wrapper. Can be used with any BLAS, although BLIS is the preferred implementation.
 Eigen A header library for linear algebra. Has a BLAS and a partial LAPACK implementation for compatibility.
 MAGMA Matrix Algebra on GPU and Multicore Architectures (MAGMA) project develops a dense linear algebra library similar to LAPACK but for heterogeneous and hybrid architectures including multicore systems accelerated with GPGPUs.
 PLASMA The Parallel Linear Algebra for Scalable Multi-core Architectures (PLASMA) project is a modern replacement of LAPACK for multi-core architectures. PLASMA is a software framework for development of asynchronous operations and features out of order scheduling with a runtime scheduler called QUARK that may be used for any code that expresses its dependencies with a directed acyclic graph.

See also

 List of numerical libraries
 Math Kernel Library (MKL)
 NAG Numerical Library
 SLATEC, a FORTRAN 77 library of mathematical and statistical routines
 QUADPACK, a FORTRAN 77 library for numerical integration

References

Fortran libraries
Free software programmed in Fortran
Numerical linear algebra
Numerical software
Software using the BSD license